is a private university in Wakayama, Wakayama, Japan. It was established in 1951.

External links
 Official website 

Educational institutions established in 1951
Private universities and colleges in Japan
Universities and colleges in Wakayama Prefecture
Japanese junior colleges
1951 establishments in Japan
Wakayama (city)